Volutopsius is a genus of sea snails, marine gastropod mollusks in the family Buccinidae, the true whelks.

Species
Species within the genus Volutopsius include:

 Volutopsius castaneus 
 Volutopsius deformis (Reeve, 1847)
 Volutopsius norwegicus (Gmelin, 1791)
 Volutopsius scotiae (Fraussen, McKay & Drewery, 2013)

References

Buccinidae